The McMaster Manufacturing Research Institute (MMRI) is a major manufacturing research facility affiliated with the Department of Mechanical Engineering at McMaster University in Hamilton, Ontario.

The institute opened in 2001, and has an endowed research chair affiliated with it. It is a member of SONAMI (the Southern Ontario Network for Advanced Manufacturing Innovation) along with centers at Niagara College, Mohawk College, and Sheridan College.

In 2020, after the impact of the COVID-19 pandemic became known, the MMRI collaborated with Hamilton Health Sciences to develop face shields and help with other types of PPE manufacturing.

References 

Manufacturing companies of Canada
Organizations based in Hamilton, Ontario
McMaster University
Manufacturing companies based in Ontario